During the 2008–09 season, the Indonesian football club Persib Bandung was placed third in the Indonesia Super League. The team reached the third round of the Indonesian Cup.

Players

Squad information

Pre-season and friendlies

Competitions

Overall

Last updated:

Indonesia Super League

League table

Results summary

Results by round

Matches

Score overview

Note: Persib Bandung goals are listed first.

Statistics

Appearances and goals

Goalscorers

Assists

Clean sheets

Disciplinary record

Suspended Players

References

Persib Bandung seasons